The Fuji Broadcasting Center (also known as FCG Building), is a 27-story complex in Odaiba, Minato,Tokyo, with a total height of .

Description
The building was designed by architect Kenzo Tange from Tange Associates, and it was the last building directly led by him in a huge project. The building is a landmark that symbolizes Odaiba.

It is the largest building in the head office building of a Japanese broadcasting station, and has the largest studio floor area (991.7 km2) as a Japanese private broadcasting station.

The structure consists of an office tower and a media tower connected by three enclosed footbridges. The exterior is cladded with salt-resistant titanium. Special care was taken with the acoustics for the building, including blocking radio waves. The Theatre mall is on the first floor, a rooftop garden is on the 7th floor, and Mezama Sky is on the 24th floor. The Hachitama Spherical Observation Room, located on the 25th floor, provides a view of Tokyo Metropolis. The sphere weighs 1,350 tons and has an off-center of center of mass, which made its installation difficult.

Studios 

 V Studio 1 – The studio was formerly housed morning news program Tokudane!.
 V Studio 2 – 
 V Studio 3 – The studio was 4K compatible. It housed the programs which aired on BS Fuji.
 V Studio 4 – Located at the 3rd floor, it is the largest studio in the head office building (the largest studio floor area for Japanese commercial broadcasters). The studio housed many Fuji TV variety and entertainment programs.
 V Studio 5 – Located at the 3rd floor, the studio housed many Fuji TV variety shows.
 V Studio 6 – 
 V Studio 7 – 
 V Studio 8 – Located at the 9th floor of media tower, the studio housed morning news program Mezamashi 8. When the V Studio 9, which is a news studio, cannot be used due to system updates, etc., this studio will be used as an alternative news studio.
 V Studio 9 – Located at the 12th floor of media tower, the studio housed morning shows Mezamashi TV, as well as other Fuji TV news programs.
 V Studio 10 –

References 

Buildings and structures in Minato, Tokyo
Television studios